Nokkethadhoorathu Kannum Nattu is a 1984 Indian Malayalam-language drama film written and directed by Fazil, and starring Mohanlal, Nadhiya Moidu, Padmini. The film features original songs composed by Jerry Amaldev and background score by Johnson. Nadhiya made her Malayalam and acting debut through this film. The film also marked the comeback of Padmini after a hiatus. Nokkethadhoorathu Kannum Nattu was the highest-grossing Malayalam films of the year at the box office and ran for more than 200 days in theatres. It won the Kerala State Film Award for Best Film with Popular Appeal and Aesthetic Value. Nadhiya won the Filmfare Award for Best Actress – Malayalam. The film was remade in Tamil titled Poove Poochooda Vaa (1985) by Fazil himself, and in Telugu as Muddula Manavaraalu (1986) by Jandhyala.

Plot
Kunjoonjamma Thomas is a widow living in the village all by herself. People always make fun of her because she is grumpy and depressed due to the deaths of her husband and her only child. Children irritate her by ringing her door bell and running away. One day, her granddaughter Girly, who she had never met, visits her. Initially, Kunjoonjamma does not like Girly, but they soon become close to each other. Kunjoonjamma takes down the door bell, saying to Girly that its only purpose was for Girly's return. Now that Girly is with her, she does not need it.

Kunjoonjamma's neighbor, Sreekumar, falls in love with Girly. One day, Sreekumar's friend, Alexi, comes to his house and sees Girly. He identifies her as a girl missing from Delhi, and immediately informs her father about her whereabouts.

Girly had run away from Delhi because she had brain tumor and does not have much time to live. She wanted to enjoy the rest of her life. When her father comes to take her back to Delhi for an urgent operation, she refuses to go, claiming that even the doctors are not sure whether the operation will be successful. Her grandmother mixes sleeping pills in soup and gives it to Girly, and her father takes her to Delhi while she is unconscious.

The movie ends with the ambulance slowly fading away into the darkness. Sreekumar watches it leave, and when he turns away he sees Kunjoonjamma refixing the door bell with the hope that Girly will return one day.

Cast
Mohanlal as Sreekumar
Nadhiya Moidu as Girly Mathew
Padmini as Kunjoonjamma Thomas, Girly's grandmother
K. P. Ummer as Mathews, Girly's father
Nedumudi Venu as the priest
Thilakan as Alexander, a school headmaster staying in the neighborhood
Maniyanpilla Raju - Abdu, Sreekumar's friend
Sukumari - Sreekumar's mother
Usha as Child Artist, In Song Lathiri Poothiri Punchiri
Master Sam as Jacob Alexander
Master Asif as Unni Alexander
Master Cherian as Jo Alexander
Fazil as Alexi (Cameo appearance)

Production 
Some portions of the film was shot at the Udaya Studios in Alappuzha, such as the dance sequences of the song "Lathiri Poothiri Punthiri Cheppo" and a Christmas scene. During that scene, Nadhiya Moidu's hand was burnt with a sparkler from a fellow dancer, which left a scar on her hand since then. Nokkethadhoorathu Kannum Nattu was the debut film of Nadhiya Moidu and the comeback film of Padmini onscreen. It is also the acting debut and the only film appearance of Fazil as of 2017, who did a minor role until 2019 film Luficer. Nadhiya Moidu's voice was dubbed by Bhagyalakshmi in the film. This film marked the film debut of director duo Siddique-Lal, who worked as assistant directors to Fazil.

Soundtrack
The music was composed by Jerry Amaldev and lyrics was written by Bichu Thirumala. The songs sung by K. S. Chithra in the film gave her first break in her career.

Reception 
The film was the second highest grossing Malayalam film of the year and was the longest running Malayalam film of the year, running for 175 days in theatres. The performances of Mohanlal, Nadhiya, and Padmini were critically acclaimed.

Awards
Kerala State Film Awards
 Best Film with Popular Appeal and Aesthetic Value - Bodhichitra (Ouseppachan, Khayas, Kurian) and Fazil
Best Female Singer - K. S Chithra

Filmfare Awards South
 Filmfare Award for Best Actress - Malayalam - Nadhiya Moidu

Remakes

A Tamil remake was made by Fazil himself as Poove Poochooda Vaa, in which Nadhiya Moidu and Padmini reprise their roles. Mohanlal's role was done by S. V. Shekhar. The film was a commercial success. It was also remade in Telugu as Muddula Manavaraalu (1986), directed by Jandhyala.

Sequel
Fazil once planned to make a sequel for the film, which did not materialise. He had a plot of Girly after the operation and Sreekumar searching for her. He said in an interview with Vanitha.

References

External links
 
 Nokkethadhoorathu Kannum Nattu at Malayalachalachithram
 Nokkethadhoorathu Kannum Nattu at Malayalasangeetham
 Nokkethadhoorathu Kannum Nattu at Spicyonion
 Article about the film in Deepika

1980s Malayalam-language films
1984 films
1984 romantic drama films
Malayalam films remade in other languages
Films directed by Fazil
Indian romantic drama films
Films scored by Jerry Amaldev